Melagaram is a panchayat town in Tenkasi district, in the Indian state of Tamil Nadu. The Famous Composer Thirigudarasapa Kavirayar was born in Melagaram. Thirutrala Kuravanji is a classic Tamil language poem composed by Thirigudarasapa Kavirayar around 1600 - 1700 CE.

Demographics
In 2001, Melagaram had a population of 12,860, according to the Indian census Males constituted 49% of the population and females 51%. Melagaram had an average literacy rate of 78%, higher than the national average of 59.5%: male literacy was 84%, and female literacy was 72%. In Melagaram, 9% of the population was under 6 years of age.

By the 2011 census, the town had grown to 14,644 inhabitants.

Location
Melagaram located between Tenkasi and Coutrallam about 1 km away from Tenkasi.

Melagaram consists of Chinthamani, Bharathi Nagar, Melagaram, NGO Colony, State Bank Colony, Indira Nagar, Min Nagar, Nannagaram, Kudiyiruppu.  

Bharathi Nagar, NGO Colony, State Bank Colony, Indira Nagar, Min Nagar are newly developed colonies in the last 25 to 30 years.

Geography

 Chitha AR River
 Paarai Kulam (Behind Brahmin Street)

Landmarks
Town Panchayat Office, Govt. Hr. Sec. School, Primary Health Center, Library

Economy
The first regional rural bank of Tamil Nadu, the Pandyan Grama Bank, has one of its branches at Melagaram.

Temples

•Shenbaga Vinayagar Temple
•Muppudathi Amman Temple
•Thangamman Temple 
•Shenbaga Devi Amman Temple
•Vinayaka Temple (South Street) 
•Vinayaka Temple (Brahmin Street)

Notes

Cities and towns in Tenkasi district